The Connellsville Cokers were an American basketball team based in Cokesville, Pennsylvania, that was a member of the Coke Basketball League.

Year-by-year

Basketball teams in Pennsylvania
1910 establishments in Pennsylvania
1912 disestablishments in Pennsylvania
Basketball teams established in 1910
Sports clubs disestablished in 1912
Fayette County, Pennsylvania
Defunct basketball teams in Pennsylvania